Királyhegyes is a village in Csongrád county, in the Southern Great Plain region of southern Hungary.

Geography

External links
Official site

References

Populated places in Csongrád-Csanád County